This is a list of horror films that were released in 2018.

References

External links
 Horror films of 2018 on Internet Movie Database

2018
2018-related lists
2018 in film